The European (UEFA) zone of qualification for the 1970 FIFA World Cup saw 29 teams competing for eight places at the finals. UEFA members England qualified automatically as the defending champions. The qualification process started on 19 May 1968 and ended on 7 December 1969.

Format
FIFA rejected the entry of Albania, while Iceland and Malta did not enter. The remaining 29 teams were drawn into eight groups, five groups of four teams and three of three teams. All eight group-winners qualified automatically.

Groups

Group 1

Group 2

Czechoslovakia and Hungary finished level on points, and a play-off on neutral ground was played to decide who would qualify. Czechoslovakia won the play-off to qualify for the World Cup.

Group 3

Group 4

Group 5

Group 6

Group 7

Group 8

Goalscorers

9 goals

 Gerd Müller

7 goals

 Luigi Riva
 Włodzimierz Lubański

6 goals

 Johan Devrindt
 Ferenc Bene
 Kazimierz Deyna
 Colin Stein
 Ove Kindvall

5 goals

 Erich Hof
 Odilon Polleunis
 Jozef Adamec

4 goals

 Helmut Redl
 Georgi Asparuhov
 Hristo Bonev
 Andrzej Jarosik
 Dragan Džajić

3 goals

 Karol Jokl
 Ole Sørensen
 Arto Tolsa
 Hervé Revelli
 Vasilis Botinos
 Giorgos Sideris
 Antal Dunai
 Ola Dybwad-Olsen
 Eusébio
 Florea Dumitrache
 Alan Gilzean
 José Eulogio Gárate
 Wolfgang Overath
 Vahidin Musemić
 Slaven Zambata

2 goals

 Wilfried Puis
 Dinko Dermendzhiev
 Vladimír Hagara
 Ladislav Kuna
 Andrej Kvašňák
 Wolfram Löwe
 Eberhard Vogel
 Tommy Lindholm
 Jean-Claude Bras
 Giorgos Dedes
 Lajos Kocsis
 Don Givens
 Sandro Mazzola
 Johny Léonard
 Theo Pahlplatz
 Terry Harkin
 Jacinto Santos
 Bobby Murdoch
 Kakhi Asatiani
 Volodymyr Muntyan
 Givi Nodia
 Amancio Amaro
 Bo Larsson
 Fritz Künzli
 Georges Vuilleumier
 Helmut Haller
 Josip Bukal
 Metodije Spasovski

1 goal

 Wilhelm Kreuz
 Helmut Siber
 August Starek
 Léon Semmeling
 Dimitar Penev
 Dimitar Yakimov
 Panicos Efthimiadis
 Nicos Kantzilieris
 Dušan Kabát
 František Veselý
 Bent Jensen
 Ulrik Le Fevre
 Ole Madsen
 Henning Frenzel
 Hans-Jürgen Kreische
 Peter Rock
 Turo Flink
 Jean Djorkaeff
 Mimis Domazos
 Kostas Elefterakis
 Giorgos Koudas
 Mimis Papaioannou
 Flórián Albert
 János Farkas
 László Fazekas
 Zoltán Halmosi
 Lajos Puskás
 Lajos Szűcs
 Eamonn Rogers
 Angelo Domenghini
 Josy Kirchens
 Paul Philipp
 Johan Cruyff
 Dick van Dijk
 Willem van Hanegem
 Wim Jansen
 Sjaak Roggeveen
 Wietse Veenstra
 Henk Wery
 George Best
 William Campbell
 Derek Dougan
 Eric McMordie
 Jimmy Nicholson
 Odd Iversen
 Bronisław Bula
 Jerzy Wilim
 José Augusto de Almeida
 Jacinto João
 Fernando Peres
 Emerich Dembrovschi
 Nicolae Dobrin
 Flavius Domide
 Billy Bremner
 Tommy Gemmell
 Eddie Gray
 Willie Henderson
 Jimmy Johnstone
 Denis Law
 Billy McNeill
 Anatoliy Byshovets
 Vitaly Khmelnitsky
 Juan Manuel Asensi
 Miguel Ángel Bustillo
 Pirri
 Joaquín Sierra
 Manuel Velázquez
 Leif Eriksson
 Ove Grahn
 Roland Grip
 Örjan Persson
 René-Pierre Quentin
 Ender Konca
 Ogün Altıparmak
 Mike England
 David Powell
 John Toshack
 Klaus Fichtel
 Sigfried Held
 Horst-Dieter Höttges
 Reinhard Libuda
 Max Lorenz
 Rudolf Belin
 Ivica Osim
 Miroslav Pavlović
 Denijal Pirić
 Edin Sprečo

1 own goal

 Johann Eigenstiller (playing against West Germany)
 José Augusto Torres (playing against Greece)
 Bruno Michaud (playing against Romania)

References

External links
 European Zone at FIFA.com

 
UEFA
FIFA World Cup qualification (UEFA)
World Cup
World Cup